Fowler may refer to:
 Fowler (surname), a surname, and list of people with the name

Places

Australia
 Division of Fowler, an electoral district in New South Wales
 Fowlers Bay, South Australia

Canada
 Fowler, British Columbia, a locality on the Stikine River, British Columbia
 Fowler, Ontario, an unincorporated area in the Kenora District, Ontario
 Fowler Lake Recreation Site, a conservation area in Rural Municipality of Loon Lake No. 561, Saskatchewan
 Fowlers Corners, Ontario, an unincorporated area in Peterborough and Victoria Counties, Ontario
 Fowlers Corners, New Brunswick, an unincorporated area in Queens County, New Brunswick

United States
 Fowler, California, a town in Fresno County
 Fowler, Colorado, a town in Otero County
 Fowler, Illinois, a village in Adams County
 Fowler, Indiana, a town in Benton County
 Fowler, Kansas, a city in Meade County
 Fowler, Michigan, a village in Clinton County
 Fowler, Missouri, an unincorporated community
 Fowler, New York, a town in St. Lawrence County
 Fowler, Oklahoma, a town in Oklahoma County on U.S. Route 62 in Oklahoma
 Fowler River in New Hampshire

Business
 Fowler Calculators, an English manufacturer of calculators and slide rules
 D. & J. Fowler Ltd., an Australian food wholesaler and manufacturer
 John Fowler & Co., manufacturers of traction engines, agricultural equipment and railway locomotives
 Fowler & Wells Company, American publishing house

Other uses 
 Fowler (crater), a large lunar impact crater on the far side of the Moon
 Fowler's Modern English Usage, an English language style guide

See also 

 Fowler flap
 Fowler's position, a standard patient position in medicine
 Fowler's solution
 Fowler's Vacola a system for preserving food in glass jars
 Veuglaire
 Wildfowl